Cerium(III) iodide (CeI3) is the compound formed by cerium(III) cations and iodide anions.

Preparation 
Cerium metal reacts with iodine when heated to form cerium(III) iodide:

It is also formed when cerium reacts with mercury(II) iodide at high temperatures:

Structure 
Cerium(III) iodide adopts the plutonium(III) bromide crystal structure. It contains 8-coordinate bicapped trigonal prismatic Ce3+ ions.

Uses 

Cerium(III) iodide is used as a pharmaceutical intermediate and as a starting material for organocerium compounds.

References

Cerium(III) compounds
Iodides
Lanthanide halides